Aravind Limbavali is an Indian politician who was served as the Minister in the Karnataka government on at least 4 occasions.  He is a member of the Karnataka Legislative Assembly and the Bharatiya Janata Party. He has continuously held the office of Member of Legislative Assembly for the Mahadevapura constituency since 2008. He has been no stranger to controversies.

Personal life
Aravind Limbavali joined Rashtriya Swayamsevak Sangh (RSS) early in his life and is involved for over 35 years. He had been an active member for Akhil Bharatiya Vidyarthi Parishad (ABVP) over the years.

Some key highlights:

-	ABVP National Secretary 1992-1995

-	“Save Campus” campaign for solving the educational problems
 
-	Worked on “Kashmir Chalo” agitation. Shri Aravind Limbavali was the leader of the Karnataka team. He was one of the five leaders chosen for the flag hoisting in Srinagar. After the team progressed until Udhampur, it was stopped there and was restricted from going further.

Declared assets 
As per regulations in India, every candidate contesting an election is expected to declare their assets in the form of an affidavit sworn before a Notary. In the span of few years, the assets of Arvind Limbavali have seen explosive growth.

Karnataka Legislative Assembly election, 2013
Aravind Limbavali was elected to Karnataka Legislative Assembly in the 2013 election from Mahadevapura (174)  constituency with 110244 votes defeating Srinivasa A.C. of Indian National Congress by 6149 votes.

He was re-elected in the Karnataka Assembly Elections held in May 2018 from the Mahadevapura constituency.

Controversies

Misbehaviour with a woman activist 
In September 2022, a video of Arvind Limbavali threatening a woman political activist had gone viral. Police can be seen whisking away the lone woman activist at the behest of Arvind Limbavali. In a clear violation of established protocols, the woman was detained at the police station until late hours and was not allowed to make phone calls. The constituent had approached the elected representative to submit a petition seeking relief. In an interview with Dighvijay News, Arvind Limbavali defended his behaviour claiming that as long as he had not raped her, the episode should not be an issue. The use of word rape while describing the argument caused embarrassment to him.

Threat to a police officer on duty 
Renuka Limbavali, the daughter of Arvind Limbavali, was accused of misbehaving with traffic police when the police pulled over her BMW car for  speeding. In the video, Renuka Limbavali can be seen threatening and intimidating officers in uniform. After the video of the episode went viral, Aravind Limbavali tendered a public apology on behalf of his daughter.

Obscene video 
In 2019, Limbavali claimed to be a victim of fake obscene video. Later, Arvind Limbavali had accused his own party-men of foul play in the fake obscene video controversy.

Corruption

A private complaint was filed before the Lokayukta court against Aravind Limbavali and 10 others for alleged violation of rules to favour a private builder ‘for pecuniary gain.’ Complainant N Nagaraj alleged that Limbavali as education minister in 2009 had favoured builder DLF putting up an unauthorised construction in Hulimavu area by directing Bruhat Bangalore Mahanagara Palike (city corporation) to widen the road there in violation of the Revised Master Plan, 2015. The high court stayed proceedings against Aravind Limbavali and acquitted him in this case.

Buffer zone violation
An open letter questioning the MLA's support for an illegal road with in the buffer zone of Pattandur Agrahara lake, was published on change.org. The petition was signed by about 8,000 citizens. The citizens were outraged at the arrogance of Aravind Limbavali at the meeting with petitioners.

Suicide of a businessman 
In January 2023, a businessman committed suicide by naming Aravind Limbavali as one of the persons who abetted his suicide. As part of investigation, the police have filed a FIR report against Aravind Limbavali. Following the episode, the opposition parties have called for his arrest. The Chief Minister Basavaraj Bommai's resignation was also sought in the aftermath of the episode.  While claiming to be innocent, Aravind Limbavali claimed that he knew the suicide victim since the later was a worker of a political worker.

Unilateral modification of Metro Plan 
In a shocker to residents of Whitefield, Aravind Limbavali was accused of unilaterally changing Metro Train route alignment, adding and deleting metro stations

Road infrastructure 
In a controversial move, Aravind Limbavali pulled up his own party Bharatiya Janata Party for its failure to maintain road infrastructure in Bengaluru city.

Horsetrading manouevres 
Aravind Limbavali was is in charge of the operation to corral 19 Congress legislators from Madhya Pradesh in a resort in Bengaluru, while Jyotiraditya Scindia carried out his coup against Kamal Nath government. The Deccan Chronicle wrote that '"Limbavali, 53, is so skillful at managing horsetrading manouevres that the media here has been finding it difficult to track down exact the whereabouts of the herd of 19 legislators"

References

Bharatiya Janata Party politicians from Karnataka
Living people
Karnataka MLAs 2008–2013
1967 births